Gottsegen is a surname. Notable people with the surname include:

György Gottsegen (1906–1965), Hungarian cardiologist
Robert Gottsegen (1919–2011), American periodontist

See also
Zack Gottsagen (born 1985), American actor